"I'm That Kind of Girl" is a song written by Matraca Berg and Ronnie Samoset, and recorded by the American country music artist Patty Loveless.  It was released in January 1991 as the third single from her album On Down the Line. Both songwriters were later credited for writing her 2003 single, "On Your Way Home".

Background
The song was in the Billboard Hot Country Singles and Tracks chart for 20 weeks, reaching number 5 during the week of March 30, 1991.

Music video
Directed by John Lloyd Miller, the video shows Loveless in several different outfits (one of which shows her in black-and-white, but the clothes in color) against an all-white background singing the song, while trying to scope out the right man. At one point she is seen with a young girl wearing the same purple dress as her in the scene. A young boy also appears, and he and an older man tip their hat to her and the girl at the end of the video.

Chart positions

Year-end charts

References

1991 singles
Patty Loveless songs
Songs written by Matraca Berg
Song recordings produced by Tony Brown (record producer)
MCA Records singles
Music videos directed by John Lloyd Miller
1990 songs
Songs written by Ronnie Samoset